Thomas Richard McCready (born 7 June 1991) is an English footballer who plays for Colwyn Bay in the Cymru North as a midfielder.

Playing career

Youth 
Born in Ellesmere Port, McCready was an Everton youth graduate before joining Hibernian on 12 July 2009.

Altrincham 
He moved to Conference Premier side Altrincham on 5 August of the following year without making an appearance for Hibs.

Chester 
After appearing in only two matches for the Robins, McCready moved to Chester, but suffered an injury shortly after.

He was later loaned to Welsh Premier League side Airbus where he scored 2 goals in 5 appearances.

Limestone College 
After being released by Chester, McCready moved to the United States and accepted a scholarship from Limestone College.

In 2014, he went on a trial at his older brother Chris' club, Morecambe, where he played for the reserves.

Morecambe 
On 4 July 2014 McCready returned to the Shrimps, also on trial.

On 23 July 2014, he signed for the club on non-contract terms.

McCready made his debut on 11 October 2014 in a 1–3 loss to Wycombe Wanderers in the League Two.

Exeter City 
On 2 February 2015, McCready joined Exeter City on a free transfer from Morecambe. He scored his first goal for the club in a League Cup tie against Sunderland. He made very few appearances for City and was released at the end of the 2016–17 season, with manager Paul Tisdale commenting that McCready "sadly had a wretched year with injury".

Career statistics

References

External links 

Profile at Limestone

1991 births
Living people
People from Ellesmere Port
English footballers
Association football midfielders
Altrincham F.C. players
Chester F.C. players
Colwyn Bay F.C. players
Airbus UK Broughton F.C. players
Morecambe F.C. players
Exeter City F.C. players
National League (English football) players
English Football League players
Sportspeople from Cheshire
Universiade silver medalists for Great Britain
Universiade medalists in football
Runcorn Linnets F.C. players
AFC Fylde players